Neochordodes is a genus of worms belonging to the family Chordodidae.

The species of this genus are found in America.

Species

Species:

Neochordodes australis 
Neochordodes bonaerensis 
Neochordodes californensis

References

Nematomorpha